Conlie is a commune in the Sarthe department in the Pays de la Loire region in north-western France.

During the Franco-Prussian War the village was the location of Camp Conlie, where thousands of Breton volunteers were kept in allegedly degrading conditions.

See also
Communes of the Sarthe department

References

Communes of Sarthe
Maine (province)